Hwang Mun-Ki, simply known as Ki, is a South Korean professional footballer who plays as a midfielder for Gangwon.

Career
On 16 September 2015, Ki made his professional debut with Académica de Coimbra in a 2015–16 Taça da Liga match against Marítimo. He made his Primeira Liga debut on 14 May 2016 by playing twenty-five minutes in a 0–2 loss against Tondela.

References

External links

1996 births
Footballers from Seoul
Living people
Association football forwards
South Korean footballers
Association football midfielders
Associação Académica de Coimbra – O.A.F. players
FC Anyang players
Gangwon FC players
Primeira Liga players
Liga Portugal 2 players
K League 2 players
K League 1 players
South Korean expatriate footballers
South Korean expatriate sportspeople in Portugal
Expatriate footballers in Portugal